Dorothea Braby (17 October 1909 – 1987) was a British artist. Although she had a long career as a freelance designer producing work for several well-known companies, Braby is best known for the book illustrations she created, particularly those for the Golden Cockerel Press.

Early life
Braby was born in Wandsworth and grew up in Putney, the third child of Percy Braby, a solicitor, and Maud Churton Braby, a journalist and author who had been born in China.  Braby was educated at the St Felix School in Southwold, and then from 1926 to 1930 at the Central School of Arts and Crafts in London. For a time she was enrolled at the Heatherley School of Fine Art and also studied art in Paris and Florence.

Career
Braby’s work was mostly as an illustrator of books, including several volumes produced by the Golden Cockerel Press. She spent eighteen months working on their 1948 edition of the Mabinogion. For The Saga of Llywarch the Old, Braby created colour engravings that resembled mediaeval ivory tablets. Among the other books she illustrated were a 1950 edition of John Keats' Poems and a 1954 edition of Oscar Wilde's Lord Arthur Savile's Crime. Her own volume, The Way of Wood Engraving was published in 1953. Braby exhibited widely, both in Britain and overseas. The Society of Women Artists, the Hampstead Artists' Council, and the Arts Council of Great Britain all showed works by Braby.

During her design career, Braby also produced work for The Radio Times, The Studio, and ICI.

In 1959, she gave up working as an artist for a full-time career as a social worker. A memorial exhibition was held at Burgh House, Hampstead, in 1988.

Selected works
Books illustrated by Braby included
 Mr Chambers and Perephone by C.Whitfield, Golden Cockerel Press, 1937
 The Ninety-First Psalm by C.Whitfield, Golden Cockerel Press, 1944
 The Lottery Ticket by V.G.Calderon, Golden Cockerel Press, 1945
 The Mabinogion by V.G.Calderon, Golden Cockerel Press, 1948
 Gilgamesh, King of Erech by F.L. Lucas, Golden Cockerel Press, 1948
 Poems by John Keats, Folio Society, 1950
 Sir Gawain and the Green Knight, Golden Cockerel Press, 1952
 The Fearless Treasure by Noel Streatfeild, Joseph, 1953
 Lord Arthur Savile's Crime by Oscar Wilde, Folio Society, 1954
 The Semi-Attached Couple by Emily Eden, Folio Society, 1954
 The Saga of Llywarch the Old by Glyn Jones, Golden Cockerel Press, 1955

Braby also wrote and illustrated The Commandments, published by Lewis in 1946, and The Way of Wood Engraving, published in 1953.

References

External links
 
  Illustrations by Braby in the Victoria & Albert Museum

1909 births
1987 deaths
20th-century British painters
20th-century English women artists
Alumni of the Central School of Art and Design
Alumni of the Heatherley School of Fine Art
Artists from London
English illustrators
English wood engravers
People educated at Saint Felix School
Women book artists
Book artists
Women engravers
20th-century engravers